Ashoka Abeysinghe  is a Sri Lankan politician, a member of the Parliament of Sri Lanka. He belongs to the United National Party. He was the first mayor of Kurunegala from the Sri Lanka Freedom Party, and later joined the United National Party. He was appointed the Deputy Minister of Transport and Civil Aviation after United National Party won the 2015 general elections.

References

Members of the 14th Parliament of Sri Lanka
Members of the 15th Parliament of Sri Lanka
Members of the 16th Parliament of Sri Lanka
Samagi Jana Balawegaya politicians
United National Party politicians
1956 births
Living people
Sri Lankan Buddhists
Sinhalese politicians